This is a list of notable golf courses in the United Kingdom and the Crown Dependencies (Channel Islands and Isle of Man).

England

Bedfordshire

 Ashridge Golf Club
 Aspley Guise & Woburn Sands Golf Club
 Bedford & County Golf Club
 Bedfordshire Golf Club
 Dunstable Downs Golf Club
 John O'Gaunt Golf Club
 Leighton Buzzard Golf Club
 South Beds Golf Club

Berkshire

 Bearwood Lakes Golf Club
 East Berkshire Golf Club
 Goring & Streatley Golf Club
 Maidenhead Golf Club
 Newbury & Crookham Golf Club
 Royal Ascot Golf Club
 Sunningdale Golf Club
 New Course
 Old Course
 Swinley Forest Golf Club
 Temple Golf Club
 West Berkshire Golf Club

Buckinghamshire

 Beaconsfield Golf Club
 Buckinghamshire Golf Club
 Burnham Beeches Golf Club
 Gerrards Cross Golf Club
 Harewood Downs Golf Club
 Harleyford Golf Club
 Lambourne Golf Club
 Woburn Golf Club
 Duchess Course
 Dukes Course
 Marquess Course

Cambridgeshire
 Gog Magog Golf Club
 Old Course
 Wandlebury Course

Cheshire
 Chester Golf Club (Curzon Park)

Cornwall and Isles of Scilly
 St Mellion International Resort
 Trevose Golf & Country Club

Derbyshire
 Buxton and High Peak Golf Club
 Cavendish Golf Club

Devon
 Royal North Devon Golf Club
 Saunton Golf Club
 East Course
 West Course

Dorset 

 Ferndown Forest Golf Club
 Meyrick Park Golf Course
 Queen's Park Golf Course

County Durham
 Blackwell Grange Golf Club
 Hartlepool Golf Club
 Seaton Carew Golf Club (22 holes, 5 "courses")
 Stressholme Golf Club
 Woodham Golf and Country Club
 Wynyard Golf Club

East Sussex
 East Sussex National Golf Club - Uckfield

Essex
 Essex Golf & Country Club - Colchester
 Frinton Golf Club - Colchester

Greater London
 Brent Valley Golf Club - Hanwell
 Hounslow Heath Golf Club - Hounslow
 London Scottish Golf Club - Wimbledon
 Richmond Golf Club - Petersham
 Richmond Park Golf Club - Roehampton
 Riverside Golf Club - Eltham
 Roehampton Club - Roehampton
 Royal Mid Surrey Golf Club - Richmond

Greater Manchester
 Bury Golf Club - Unsworth
 Chorlton-cum-Hardy Golf Club - Northenden
 Manchester Golf Club - Middleton

Hampshire
 Army Golf Club - Aldershot
 Gosport and Stokes Bay Golf Club - Haslar
 Southampton City Golf Club - Southampton

Hertfordshire
 Ashridge Golf Club - Berkhamstead
 Bassingbourn Barracks Golf Club - Royston
 Batchwood Hall Golf Club - St Albans
 Bushey Hall Golf Club - Bushey
 Forest Hills Golf Club (Hertford) - Hertford
 Hanbury Manor Golf Club - Thundridge
 Harpenden Common Golf Club - Harpenden
 Moor Park Golf Club - Rickmansworth
 Oxhey Park Golf Club - Watford

Kent
 Ashford (Kent) Golf Club - Ashford
 Canterbury Golf Club - Canterbury
 Chart Hills Golf Club - Headcorn
 Kingshill Golf Club - West Malling
 Prince's Golf Club - Sandwich
 Royal Cinque Ports Golf Club - Deal
 Royal St George's Golf Club - Sandwich
 The London Golf Club - Sevenoaks

Lancashire
 Blackpool Park Golf Club - Blackpool
 Darwen Golf Club - Blackburn
 Fairhaven Golf Club - Lytham St Annes
 Lancaster Golf Club - Lancaster
 Lytham Green Drive Golf Club - Lytham St Annes
 Royal Lytham & St Annes Golf Club - Lytham St Annes
 St Annes Old Links Golf Club - St Annes on Sea
 Silverdale Golf Club - Carnforth
 Wilpshire Golf Club - Blackburn

Lincolnshire
 Woodhall Spa Golf Club - Woodhall Spa

Merseyside
 Formby Golf Club - Formby
 Hillside Golf Club - Southport
 Huyton & Prescot Golf Club - Huyton
 Prenton Golf Club - Birkenhead
 Royal Birkdale Golf Club - Southport
 Royal Liverpool Golf Club, Hoylake
 Southport and Ainsdale Golf Club - Southport
 Wellington Golf Club - Wirral

Norfolk
 Hunstanton Golf Club - Old Hunstanton
 Richmond Park Golf Club - Thetford
 Royal West Norfolk Golf Club - King's Lynn
 Sheringham Golf Club - Sheringham

Northamptonshire
 Northampton Golf Club - Northampton

North Yorkshire
 Fulford Golf Club - York
 Ganton Golf Club - Scarborough
 Richmond Golf Club - Darlington
 Skipton Golf Club - Skipton

Nottinghamshire
 Notts Golf Club (Hollinwell)
 Radcliffe-on-Trent Golf Club

Oxfordshire
 Frilford Heath Golf Club
 Blue Course
 Green Course
 Red Course
 The Oxfordshire Golf Club

Shropshire
 Church Stretton Golf Club
 Llanymynech Golf Club

Somerset
 Burnham & Berrow Golf Club
 Championship Course
 Channel Course (9 holes)
 Enmore Park Golf Club
 Long Ashton Golf Club

South Yorkshire
 Lindrick Golf Club - Worksop

Suffolk
 Felixstowe Ferry Golf Club - Felixstowe

Surrey
 Foxhills Golf Club - Ottershaw
 Guildford Golf Club - Guildford
 Oak Park Golf Club - Farnham
 Walton Heath Golf Club - Tadworth
 Wentworth Golf Club - Bagshot

Warwickshire
 The Belfry
 Brabazon Course
 Derby Course
 PGA National Course
 Forest of Arden Hotel & Country Club

West Midlands
 Little Aston Golf Club - Sutton Coldfield

West Sussex
 Mannings Heath Golf Club - Horsham
 Worthing Golf Club - Worthing

West Yorkshire
 Horsforth Golf Club - Horsforth
 Ilkley Golf Club - Ilkley
 Moortown Golf Club - Leeds
 Skipton Golf Club - Skipton

Worcestershire
 Blackwell Golf Club

Channel Islands

Guernsey
 La Grande Mare
 St. Pierre Park Golf Club

Jersey
 La Moye Golf Club

Northern Ireland

County Antrim and Belfast
 Balmoral Golf Club - Belfast
 Belvoir Park Golf Club - Belfast
 Cliftonville Golf Club - Belfast
 Dunmurry Golf Club - Dunmurry
 Malone Golf Club - Belfast
 Royal Portrush Golf Club - Portrush
 Temple Golf Club Ireland - Lisburn

County Down
 Royal Belfast Golf Club - Holywood
 Royal County Down Golf Club - Newcastle

County Londonderry
 Moyola Park Golf Club - Castledawson
 Portstewart Golf Club - Portstewart

Scotland

Aberdeenshire and Grampian
 Aboyne Golf Club - Aboyne
 Buckpool Golf Club - Buckie
 Duff House Royal Golf Club - Banff
 Murcar Links Golf Club - Aberdeen
 Newburgh On Ythan Golf Club - Newburgh
 Peterhead Golf Club - Peterhead
 Portlethen Golf Club - Aberdeen
 Royal Aberdeen Golf Club - Aberdeen

Fife
 Crail Golfing Society, Balcomie Links - Crail
 Elie Golf Club - Elie and Earlsferry
 Fairmont St Andrews, Kittocks Course - St Andrews
 Old Course at St Andrews - St Andrews
 St Andrews Links, Balgove Course - St Andrews
 Scotscraig Golf Club - Tayport

Highland
 Moray Golf Club - Lossiemouth
 Nairn Golf Club - Nairn
 Royal Dornoch Golf Club - Dornoch
 Wick Golf Club - Wick

Lothians
 Balbardie Park of Peace Golf Course - Bathgate
 Binny Golf Club - Broxburn
 Broomieknowe Golf Club - Bonnyrigg
 Bruntsfield Links - Edinburgh
 Muirfield - Gullane
 North Berwick Golf Club - Berwick
 Polkemmet Golf Club - Bathgate
 The Royal Burgess Golfing Society of Edinburgh - Edinburgh
 Royal Musselburgh Golf Club - Prestonpans
 Tantallon Golf Club - Berwick
 Turnhouse Golf Club - Edinburgh

Scottish Borders
 Galashiels Golf Club - Galashiels

Tayside
 King James VI Golf Club - Perth
 Murrayshall Country Estate & Golf Club - Scone
 Panmure Golf Club - Carnoustie
 Royal Perth Golfing Society - Perth

West Coast
 Dullatur Golf Club - Glasgow
 Erskine Golf Club - Bishopton
 Glasgow Golf Club - Glasgow
 Kilmarnock (Barassie) Golf Club - Troon
 Kirkhill Golf Club - Cambuslang
 Loch Lomond Golf Club - Dunbartonshire
 Machrihanish Golf Club - Campbeltown
 Prestwick Golf Club - Prestwick
 Renfrew Golf Club - Renfrew
 Royal Troon Golf Club - Troon

Wales

Cardiff and Vale of Glamorgan
 Glamorganshire Golf Club - Penarth
 Llanishen Golf Club - Cardiff
 Radyr Golf Club - Cardiff
 Wenvoe Castle Golf Club -Wenvoe
 Whitchurch Golf Club - Cardiff

Carmarthenshire
 Glyn Abbey Golf Club - Kidwelly
 Machynys Peninsula Golf Club - Llanelli

Denbighshire / Flintshire / Wrexham
 Denbigh Golf Club - Denbigh
 Holywell Golf Club - Holywell
 Mold Golf Club - Mold
 Old Padeswood Golf Club - Mold
 Rhyl Golf Club - Rhyl

Gwynedd and Conwy
 Abergele Golf Club - Abergele
 Abersoch Golf Club - Abersoch
 Nefyn & District Golf Club - Pwllheli

Newport / Monmouthshire / Torfaen / Blaenau Gwent
 Alice Springs Golf Club - Usk
 Celtic Manor Hotel & Country Club - Newport
 Llanwern Golf Club - Llanwern
 Monmouth Golf Club - Monmouth
 The Rolls of Monmouth Golf Club - Monmouth

Powys
 Llanymynech Golf Club - Llanymynech

Rhondda Cynon Taff / Merthyr Tydfil County Borough / Caerphilly
 Aberdare Golf Club - Aberdare
 Caerphilly Golf Club - Caerphilly

Swansea / Neath Port Talbot / Bridgend
 Inco Golf Club - Swansea
 Langland Bay Golf Club - Swansea
 Royal Porthcawl Golf Club - Porthcawl
 Southerndown Golf Club - Bridgend

See also
 Sport in the United Kingdom

References

External links

  History Today: Scottish Croquet: The English Golf Boom, 1880-1914

 
United Kingdom, courses
Golf courses